Lukáš Micherda (born 29 September 1994) is a Slovak football defender who currently plays for Odeva Lipany on loan from Partizán Bardejov.

Club career

1. FC Tatran Prešov
Micherda made his professional Fortuna Liga debut for Tatran Prešov against Ružomberok, on 16 July 2016.

Partizán Bardejov
Micherda joined Partizán Bardejov in January 2019. On 3 August 2019 Odeva Lipany announced, that Micharda had joined the club on loan.

References

External links
 1. FC Tatran Prešov official club profile
 Fortuna Liga profile
 
 Eurofotbal profile
 Futbalnet profile

1994 births
Living people
Slovak footballers
Association football defenders
1. FC Tatran Prešov players
Partizán Bardejov players
ŠK Odeva Lipany players
Slovak Super Liga players
2. Liga (Slovakia) players
Sportspeople from Spišská Nová Ves